Mordellistena manteroi is a species of beetles is the family Mordellidae.

References

manteroi
Beetles described in 1854